Unfinished Business is the fourth and final studio album by American rapper and Screwed Up Click member Big Moe. It was released on March 18, 2008, via Wreckshop Records, Koch Records and Doc Music Group. It was released posthumously, after Moe's death in 2007. The album peaked at #73 on the US Billboard Top R&B/Hip-Hop Albums.

Track listing

Charts

References

External links

2008 albums
Big Moe albums
Albums published posthumously